The Putliwale are a Muslim community found in the state of Uttar Pradesh in India.

Origin
The word Putliwale is a combination of two terms, putli which means a puppet in Urdu and wale meaning people. They claim to be of Pathan origin. According to their traditions, the Mughal Emperor Akbar was displeased with a group of Pathan, whom he had imprisoned. In prison, they learned the art of puppetry. Subsequently, they migrated to Lucknow. Their claim to Pathan origin is accepted by other communities of Pathan status. The community is only found in Lucknow and neighbouring parts of Awadh. They speak both Urdu and Hindi.

Present circumstances
The Putliwale are an endogamous community, and the prefer marrying close kin. They are a landless community, found in the urban centres of Awadh. Their traditional occupation was puppetry, which they performed for their patrons, the taluqdars of Awadh.  After the abolition of the zamindari system in Uttar Pradesh, they lost their main source of income and took up a variety of jobs such rickshaw pulling and running paan shops. Like other former Muslim artisan communities, they have seen a severe economic decline, and their traditional craft has become obsolete.  They are Sunni Muslims and have customs similar to other neighbouring Muslim groups.

See also
Pashtuns

References

Social groups of Uttar Pradesh
Muslim communities of Uttar Pradesh
Muslim communities of India
Pashtun diaspora in India
Puppetry in India